General Clarke may refer to:

Alured Clarke (1744–1832), British Army general
Andrew Clarke (British Army officer, born 1824) (1824–1902), British Army lieutenant general
Bruce C. Clarke (1901–1988), U.S. Army four-star general
Carter W. Clarke (1896–1987), U.S. Army brigadier general
Sir Charles Clarke, 3rd Baronet (1839–1932), British Army general
Frederick J. Clarke (1915–2002), U.S. Army lieutenant general
George Calvert Clarke (1814–1900), British Army general
Goland Clarke (1875–1944), British Army brigadier general
Henri Jacques Guillaume Clarke (1765–1818), Marshal of France
Mary E. Clarke (1924–2011), U.S. Army major general
Richard D. Clarke (born 1960), U.S. Army four-star general 
Somerset M. Wiseman Clarke (1830–1905), British Army lieutenant general
Stanley E. Clarke III (fl. 1980s–2010s), U.S. Air Force lieutenant general
Thomas Clarke (British Army officer) (died 1799), British Army general
Travers Clarke (1871–1962), British Army lieutenant general
Willoughby Clarke (1833–1909), British Indian Army major general

See also
General Clark (disambiguation)
Attorney General Clarke (disambiguation)